"Easy" is a 1989 song by British, Italy based Eurodance artist Ice MC. It features vocals by German singer Jasmine Heinrich and is his first single, produced by Italian music producer and composer Roberto Zanetti. Released as the lead single from the album, Cinema, it enjoyed success all over Europe, reaching the Top 5 in Italy and Switzerland, and the Top 3 in Spain (number two) and West Germany (number three). In the US, it peaked at number four on MTV's Video Rap Chart. There were made two different versions of the music video for the song.

Critical reception
Bill Coleman from Billboard wrote, "First strains of influence by Milli Vanillis chart dominance are felt on this pop-slanted rap track." David Giles from Music Week described it as a "pleasant rap/soul collaboration, and in places there is even a hint of reggae toasting in the vocals." He added, "Lyrically it appears to be an opportunity to namecheck all Ice's favourite musical styles and artists, but cryptic enough to keep us guessing." 

A reviewer from The Network Forty commented, "Imagine a rap song produced by David Foster, featuring lapses of Jeffrey Osborne balladering, while Maddy Hayes' secretary murmurs "Real Intellectual Muscle" throughout and you have this innovative new crossover record." Tom Doyle from Smash Hits noted the song as "a good rap record which sounds very mean "n" tough in the verses and a bit like Milli Vanilli in the choruses. Very singable and happy."

Track listing

Charts

References

 

1989 songs
1989 debut singles
Ice MC songs
English-language Italian songs
ZYX Music singles